The Basor or Bansor are a Hindu caste found in the state of Uttar Pradesh & Madhya Pradesh. They have scheduled caste status and also belongs to kshatriya status because they also used to make bamboo based weapons for soldiers.

Origin

The Basor were traditionally involved in the manufacture of bamboo furniture, bamboo handcraft etc. Their name means an artist and also a worker in bamboo. The Basor are found mainly in the districts of Jalaun, Hamirpur, Mahoba, Jhansi, Kanpur and Banda. Some Basor belongs to Jabalpur, Bhopal and Sagar districts of Madhya Pradesh. They speak Bundelkhandi dialect, although most can also understand the high version of Hindi, known as khari Boli.

Present circumstances

The Basor practice strict community endogamy, as well as clan exogamy, which is a common practice among most North Indian Hindus. Their clans are called gotras, the main ones being the Bahmangot, Dhuneb, Katahriya, Sikarwar, Samangot, Sonach and Supa. Marriages do not occur with the Muslim Bansphor community. The Basor live in multi-caste villages, but occupy their own distinct quarters. Each of their settlement contains an informal caste council, known as a panchayat. The panchayat is headed by a pradhan, a position which is hereditary. In addition, there is an overarching panchayat of between three and four villages, which headed by a chaudhary. The panchayat resolves any intra-community dispute, as well as acting an instrument of social control. They are Hindus and have Lakshmi and Durga as their tribal deities.

The Basor are marginal farmers, sharecroppers and also belongs to kshatriya status. Their traditional occupation was basket making, bamboo handcraft items and animal husbandry. Like other artisan castes, they have seen in their traditional occupation, with a concurrent rise in the number of daily wage labourers. Traditionally, they used to work as a labourers and bamboo works. They also act as village musicians especially during processions, marriages and other socio-religious ceremonies.

The 2011 Census of India for Uttar Pradesh showed the Basor population as 129,885.

References

Scheduled Castes of Uttar Pradesh